Lins may refer to:

People
 Ivan Lins, Brazilian singer and composer
 Luizianne Lins, Brazilian politician
 Paulo Lins, Brazilian writer
 , German singer and author

Places
 Lins, São Paulo, Brazil

See also
 Linse, a surname and a given name